Group Sex/Wild in the Streets is a compilation album by American hardcore punk band Circle Jerks, released in 1988 by Frontier Records. It is a CD re-release of the band's first two albums, Group Sex (1980) and Wild in the Streets (1982), containing all of the tracks from both releases.

Track listing
 Track 1-14: Group Sex.
 Track 15-29: Wild in the Streets.

 "Deny Everything" (0:27)
 "I Just Want Some Skank" (1:09)
 "Beverly Hills" (1:06)
 "Operation" (1:30)
 "Back Against the Wall" (1:35)
 "Wasted" (0:43)
 "Behind the Door" (1:25)
 "World Up My Ass" (1:17)
 "Paid Vacation" (1:28)
 "Don't Care" (0:35)
 "Live Fast Die Young" (1:33)
 "What's Your Problem" (0:57)
 "Group Sex" (1:03)
 "Red Tape" (0:56)
 "Wild in the Streets" (2:33)
 "Leave Me Alone" (1:18)
 "Stars and Stripes" (1:39)
 "86'd (Good as Gone)" (1:54)
 "Meet the Press" (1:19)
 "Trapped" (1:39)
 "Murder the Disturbed" (2:01)
 "Letter Bomb" (1:13)
 "Question Authority" (2:00)
 "Defamation Innuendo" (2:21)
 "Moral Majority" (0:54)
 "Forced Labor" (1:16)
 "Political Stu" (1:36)
 "Just Like Me" (1:46)
 "Put a Little Love in Your Heart" (2:12)

Release and reception

In an AllMusic review, Sean Westergaard says "In 1993, Frontier combined the first two albums from the Circle Jerks onto a single cassette and a double-LP set. Group Sex (1980) is their finest album, and together with Wild in the Streets (1982), is an excellent way to check out the beginnings of this important early-'80s SoCal hardcore band.".

References

1986 compilation albums
Circle Jerks albums